Rafael Orozco, el ídolo is a Colombian biographical telenovela produced by Asier Aguilar Amuchastegui for Caracol Televisión. Based on the life of the Colombian singer of vallenato Rafael Orozco Maestre. It stars Alejandro Palacio as the titular character. The series follows the life of Rafael Orozco Maestre in his romantic moments and why he was killed.

Plot 
"Rafa", as they called it in confidence, was destined to be of those people who never forget. From a very young age he had a special talent for vallenata music, but also possessed a charm that made him irresistible to women. But Clara Cabello was different from all the others, so, from the first day she met her, she was spellbound with her smile, her words and her gaze. And although many were going to stand in the way to conquer his heart, he knew that love would make his songs immortal, so he had no doubt that she would be forever at his side on his way to success.

But on the night of June 11, 1992, her romantic voice was silenced forever. Nine bullets were needed to end the life of that man who thrilled the world through his unforgettable songs. Why did they kill him? Who killed him? This is the question that everyone is asked.

Cast

Main 
 Alejandro Palacio as Rafael Orozco Maestre
 Taliana Vargas as Clara Cabello de Orozco
 Maritza Rodríguez as Martha Mónica Camargo
 Mario Espitia as Ernesto "Teto" Tello
 Ángela Vergara as Mariela de Cabello
 Alberto Pujol as Jacinto Cabello
 Myriam de Lourdes as Cristina Maestre de Orozco
 Rafael Camerano as Rafael Orozco Fernández
 Gabriela Ávila as Betty Cabello
 Martín Armenta as Jeremías Orozco
 Camila Zárate as Luisa
 Peter Cárdenas as Misael Orozco
 María Teresa Carrasco as Myriam Cabello
 Freddy Flórez as Hernán Murgas
 Cristina García as Ninfa
 Rafael Ricardo as Compai Chipuco
 Víctor Navarro as Luciano Poveda
 Éibar Gutiérrez as Egidio Oviedo
 Rafael Santos as Dionisio Maestre
 Aco Pérez as Virgilio Barrera
 Mauricio Castillo as Bassist
 Carlos Andrés Villa as Israel Romero

Recurring 
 Alejandro López as Alfredo Benedetti
 Mauricio Cújar as Chepe Pinto
 Luis Fernando Bohórquez as Álvaro Arango
 Laura Londoño as Silvia Duque
 Jairo Camargo as Dr. Duque
 Juan Pablo Posada as Alberto Santamaría
 Liliana Escobar as La profe Doni
 José Sedek as Roberto Mancini
 Felipe Galofre as Gomoso
 Carlos Vergara Montiel as Fabio Poveda Márquez
 Xilena Aycardi as Luz Marina
 Rita Bendeck as Carlota
 Heriberto Sandoval as Jorge Barón
 Daniela Tapia as Chila
 Luis Fernando Múnera as Alfonso López 
 Liesel Potdevin as La Generala
 Katherine Escobar as Coraima Ruiz
 George Slebi as Sergio
 Orlando Valenzuela as Quique Sierra
 Adriana Bottina as La copetona
 Luigi Aycardi as Julio Martelo
 Paolo Ragone as Reginaldo
 Andrea Ribelles as Olga
 Hada Vanessa as Rita

References 

2012 telenovelas
2012 Colombian television series debuts
2013 Colombian television series endings
Spanish-language telenovelas
Caracol Televisión telenovelas
Colombian telenovelas
Television series based on singers and musicians
Television shows set in Colombia